The 2019 Lima Challenger was a professional tennis tournament played on clay courts. It was the thirteenth edition of the tournament which was part of the 2019 ATP Challenger Tour. It took place in Lima, Peru between October 21 and October 27, 2019.

Singles main-draw entrants

Seeds

 1 Rankings are as of 14 October 2019.

Other entrants
The following players received wildcards into the singles main draw:
  Mauricio Echazú
  Arklon Huertas del Pino
  Conner Huertas del Pino
  Pedro Iamachkine
  Jorge Panta

The following player received entry into the singles main draw using a protected ranking:
  Íñigo Cervantes

The following player received entry into the singles main draw as an alternate:
  Camilo Ugo Carabelli

The following players received entry from the qualifying draw:
  Alejandro González
  Rafael Matos

Champions

Singles

  Thiago Monteiro def.  Federico Coria 6–2, 6–7(7–9), 6–4.

Doubles

  Ariel Behar /  Gonzalo Escobar def.  Luis David Martínez /  Felipe Meligeni Alves 6–2, 2–6, [10–3].

References

2019 ATP Challenger Tour
2019
October 2019 sports events in South America
2019 in Peruvian sport